Qayah Qeshlaqi (also Romanized as Qayah Qeshlāqī; also known as Qarah Qeshlāqī) is a village in Varqeh Rural District, in the Central District of Charuymaq County, East Azerbaijan Province, Iran. At the 2006 census, its population was 22, in 4 families.

References 

Populated places in Charuymaq County